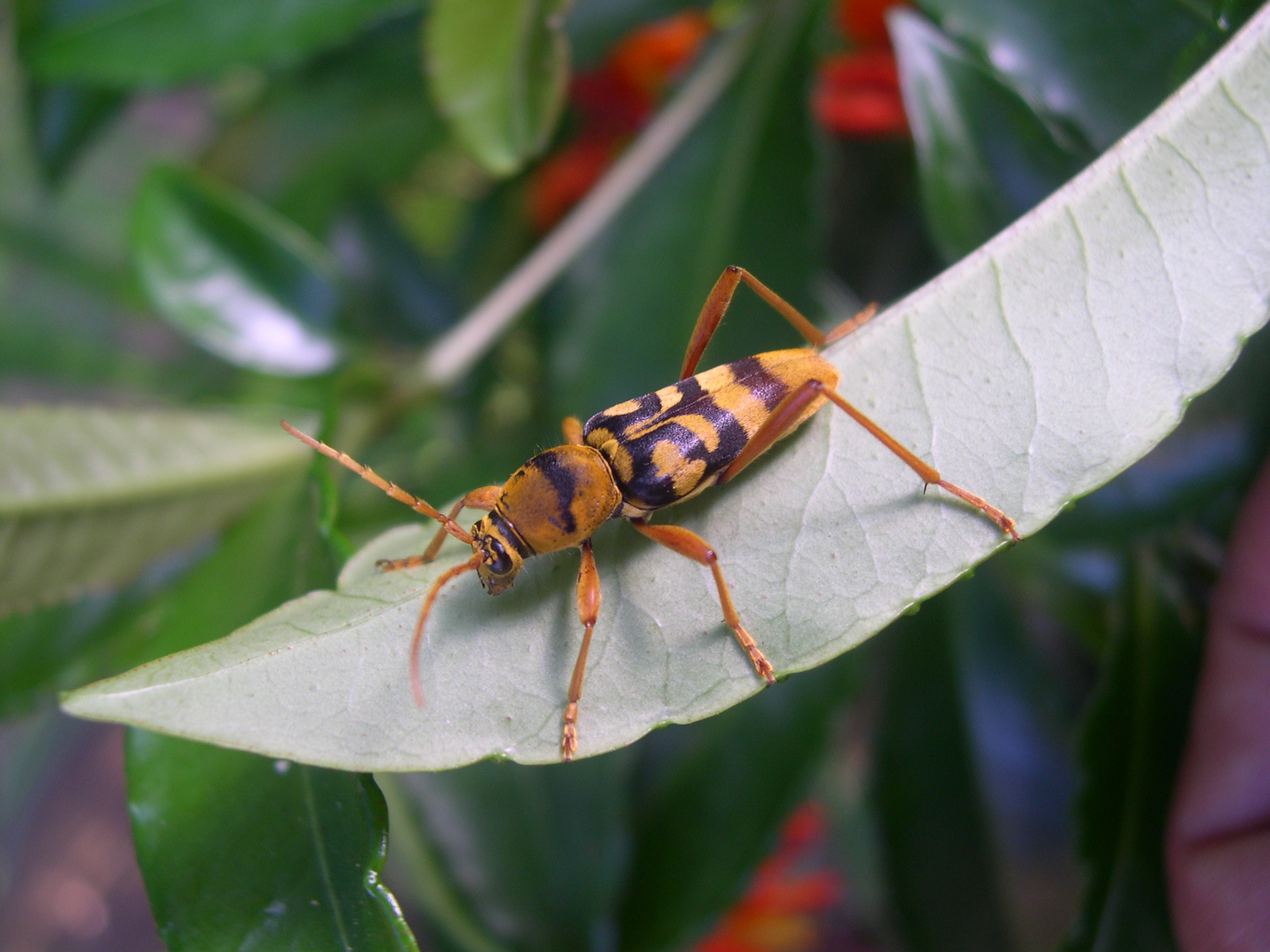

Scientific classification
- Domain: Eukaryota
- Kingdom: Animalia
- Phylum: Arthropoda
- Class: Insecta
- Order: Coleoptera
- Suborder: Polyphaga
- Infraorder: Cucujiformia
- Family: Cerambycidae
- Genus: Humeromaculatus
- Species: H. quinquefasciatus

Binomial name
- Humeromaculatus quinquefasciatus (Laporte de Castelnau & Gory, 1836)

= Humeromaculatus quinquefasciatus =

Species of beetle

Humeromaculatus quinquefasciatus is a species of beetle in the family Cerambycidae. It was described by Laporte de Castelnau and Gory in 1836.
